Carl Heger (17 April 1910 – 2 May 2002) was a Danish actor. He appeared in more than 25 films between 1938 and 1956.

Selected filmography
 Blaavand melder storm (1938)
 Life on the Hegn Farm (1938)
 The Burning Question (1943)
 The Viking Watch of the Danish Seaman (1948)
 Mosekongen (1950)
 Det Sande Ansigt (1951)
 Husmandstøsen (1952)
 The Old Mill on Mols (1953)
 Altid ballade (1955)
 Hejrenæs (1953)

References

External links

1910 births
2002 deaths
Danish male film actors
Place of birth missing